Doživjeti stotu (trans. Live to Be 100) is the fifth studio album by Yugoslav rock band Bijelo Dugme, released in 1980.

The album marked the band's shift from their folk-influenced hard rock sound towards new wave. It is the band's second and the last studio album to feature Zoran "Điđi" Jankelić on drums.

Doživjeti stotu was polled in 1998 as the 35th on the list of 100 greatest Yugoslav rock and pop albums in the book YU 100: najbolji albumi jugoslovenske rok i pop muzike (YU 100: The Best Albums of Yugoslav Pop and Rock Music).

Background
During the late 1970s and early 1980s, the Yugoslav rock scene saw the emergence of a number of new wave and punk bands. Noting this trend in popular music in the country, Bijelo Dugme leader Goran Bregović reportedly became fascinated with the developing scene based around the emerging bands, especially with the works of Azra and Prljavo Kazalište. During 1980, the band decided to move towards new sound. In December 1980, Bijelo Dugme released new wave-influenced album Doživjeti stotu.

Doživjeti stotu was the first Bijelo Dugme album produced by the band's guitarist and leader Goran Bregović. Unlike the songs from the band's previous albums, which were prepared long before album recording, most of the songs from Doživjeti stotu were created during the recording sessions. As the recordings had to be finished before the scheduled mastering in London, Bregović reportedly resorted to using cocaine in order to stay awake, writing the lyrics in the nick of time. The saxophone on the recording was played by jazz saxophonist Jovan Maljoković and avant-garde musician Paul Pignon; Bregović stated that they originally invited Stjepko Gut to play brass sections, but that he turned them down.

From the songs on the album, only "Pristao sam biću sve što hoće" and "Pjesma mom mlađem bratu" resembled Bijelo Dugme's old sound. The songs "Ha ha ha" and "Tramvaj kreće (ili kako biti heroj u ova šugava vremena)" were the first Bijelo Dugme songs to feature political-related lyrics. In accordance with their shift towards new wave, the band changed their hard rock style: the members cut their hair short, and the frontman Željko Bebek shaved his trademark moustache.

Album cover
The provocative cover, which appeared in three different versions, was designed by Mirko Ilić, artist closely associated with the Yugoslav new wave scene. It was the first time that the band did not work with their old collaborator Dragan S. Stefanović on the album cover.

Track listing
All songs written by Goran Bregović, except where noted.

Personnel
Goran Bregović - guitar, producer
Željko Bebek - vocals
Zoran Redžić - bass, wall pro bass
Điđi Jankelić - drums
Vlado Pravdić - keyboards, polymoog

Additional personnel
Jelenko Milaković - percussion
Jovan Maljoković - saxophone
Paul Pignon - saxophone
Predrag Kostić - trumpet
Rade Ercegovac - engineer
Mirko Ilić - design
Željko Stojanović - photography

Reception and reactions
Immediately after the release, the song "Čudesno jutro u krevetu gospođe Petrović" received a radio ban on some radio and TV stations due to the lyric "sve u finu materinu".

Due to the radically new sound, the album was met with a lot of skepticism. However, bandleader Bregović stated as the group prepared to start a tour:

Most of the critics, however, praised the album. In the album review published in Duga magazine, Petar Luković wrote:

At the end of 1980, the readers of Džuboks magazine polled Bijelo Dugme the Band of the Year, Željko Bebek the Singer of the Year, the band's keyboardist Vlado Pravdić the Keyboardist of the Year, Điđi Jankelić the Drummer of the Year, the band's bass guitarist Zoran Redžić the Bass Guitarist of the Year, Goran Bregović the Composer, the Lyricist, the Producer and the Arranger of the Year, Doživjeti stotu the Album of the Year, and Doživjeti stotu cover the Album Cover of the Year.

Former Bijelo Dugme drummer Milić Vukašinović ridiculed Bijelo Dugme's new sound and style in the songs "Poštovani ska ska" ("Dear Mr. Ska Ska) and "Živio rock 'n' roll" ("Long Live Rock 'n' Roll"), released on the 1982 album Živio rock 'n' roll by his hard rock band Vatreni Poljubac.

Legacy

Doživjeti stotu was polled in 1998 as the 35th on the list of 100 greatest Yugoslav rock and pop albums in the book YU 100: najbolji albumi jugoslovenske rok i pop muzike (YU 100: The Best Albums of Yugoslav Pop and Rock Music).

Covers
Yugoslav pop trio Aska recorded a Bijelo Dugme songs medley on their 1982 album Disco Rock, featuring, among other Bijelo Dugme songs, "Zažmiri i broj" and "Doživjeti stotu".
Serbian rock band Balkan Express recorded a cover of "Pristao sam biću sve što hoće" on their 1998 album Preporučeno (Registered).
Croatian rock singer Massimo Savić recorded a cover of "Pristao sam biću sve što hoće" on his 2006 album Vještina II (Art II).
The melody of Los Del Rio's monster hit "Macarena" may have been borrowed from the song "Tramvaj kreće".

References

Doživjeti stotu at Discogs

External links
Doživjeti stotu at Discogs

1980 albums
Bijelo Dugme albums
Jugoton albums